A Very Still Life is the first and only album by Jack Kevorkian, released on the Lucid Subjazz label, in which he plays the flute. It was released on May 27, 1997. The 5000-unit limited release was reviewed in Entertainment Weekly online as "weird" but "good natured". The CD initially suffered from slow sales. As of 1997, 1400 units had been sold.  Kevorkian wrote all the songs but one; the album was reviewed in jazzreview.com as "very much grooviness" except for one tune, with "stuff in between that's worthy of multiple spins.

Track listing
 Whispering, Came Violets  
 Summertooth  
 Brotherhood Of  
 Very Still Life  
 August to Amber  
 Fuguetta Caffeine  
 Interlude: Unfinished Minuet  
 In Strange Loops  
 Back at Abby's  
 Interlude: Gavat  
 Geoff's Mood  
 Une Lettre de Jean

References

1997 debut albums
Jazz albums by American artists
Jack Kevorkian albums